The Mende Kikakui script is a syllabary used for writing the Mende language of Sierra Leone.

History 

It was devised by Mohamed Turay (born ca. 1850), an Islamic scholar, at a town called Maka (Barri Chiefdom, southern Sierra Leone). One of Turay's Quranic students was a young Kuranko man named Kisimi Kamara. Kamara was the grandson of Turay's sister. Kamara also married Turay's daughter, Mariama. Turay devised a form of writing called 'Mende Abajada' (meaning 'Mende alphabet'), which was inspired in part by the Arabic abjad and in part by the Vai syllabary. Some scholars have also suggested that some of the characters were inspired by certain indigenous Mende pictograms and cryptographic characters that are widely known to the Mende people.

Turay's "Mende Abajada" was adjusted a bit (order of characters) by Kamara and probably corresponds to the first 42 characters of the script, which is an abugida. Kamara developed the script further with help from his brothers, adding more than 150 other syllabic characters. Kamara then popularized the script and gained quite a following as result—which he used to help establish himself as one of the most important chiefs in southern Sierra Leone during his time (he was not a 'simple village tailor' as suggested by some contemporary writers). The script achieved widespread use for a time, but has largely been replaced with an alphabet based on the Latin script, and the Mende script is considered a "failed script".

Kikakui is still used today, but perhaps by less than 500 people. There is also an associated number writing system, which is entirely original (and, like the characters of the script, written from right to left).

Characters
There were an original 42 syllabic characters that were ordered according to sound and shape, while 150 more characters were later added without the same consistency to the character set. Some of the initial 42 characters resemble an abugida, given the standard ability for a reader to discern the vowels from seeing the character, as indicated by dots in consistent locations, but such uniformity vanishes in the remaining 150 characters. Glyphic variants have been found for certain characters.

Additionally, digits are encoded by indicating the place value on each digit for a number, with the units digit alone having no special indication. Beyond the 10s digit, the further digits are written on top of the base place value indicator, which increases in vertical lines from 2 at the 100s place (indicating 2*10 + the digit above) to the millionths digit that is encoded (which has 6). All of the different possible digits are encoded separately.

Unicode

Mende Kikakui script was added to the Unicode Standard in June 2014 with the release of version 7.0.

The Unicode block for Mende Kikakui is U+1E800–U+1E8DF:

References 

Konrad Tuchscherer, African Script and Scripture: The History of the Kikakui (Mende) Writing System for Bible Translations," African Languages and Cultures, 8, 2 (1995), pp. 169–188. <https://www.jstor.org/stable/1771691>

External links 
http://www.omniglot.com/writing/mende.htm

Syllabary writing systems
Writing systems of Africa
Abugida writing systems
Constructed scripts
Mende language
Right-to-left writing systems